Millard P. Robinson Sr. (c. 1913 – June 10, 1999) was a minor league baseball player and high school and college American football coach. He served as the head football coach at Swarthmore High School in Swarthmore, Pennsylvania from 1949 to 1972 and at Swarthmore College in 1973.

Robinson played college football at West Chester State Teachers College—now known as West Chester University—in West Chester, Pennsylvania under head coach Glenn Killinger. He began his coaching and teaching career at Upper Yoder High School, near Johnstown, Pennsylvania. In 1939, Robinson was appointed he football coach at Prospect Park High School in Prospect Park, Pennsylvania. Following service in the United States Navy during World War II, Robinson return to coaching and teaching in 1946 at Swarthmore High School.

Robinson died at the age of 85 of a brain tumor, on June 10, 1999, at his home in Media, Pennsylvania.

Head coaching record

College

References

External links

Year of birth missing
1910s births
1999 deaths
Rome Colonels players
Swarthmore Garnet Tide football coaches
West Chester Golden Rams football players
High school football coaches in Pennsylvania
Schoolteachers from Pennsylvania
United States Navy personnel of World War II
Coaches of American football from Pennsylvania
Players of American football from Pennsylvania
Deaths from cancer in Pennsylvania
Deaths from brain cancer in the United States